U Mumba Volley was a men's volleyball team from Mumbai, Maharastra playing in the Pro Volleyball League in India.

Team

 
Source:

References

Volleyball in India
Men's volleyball teams